Long Time Passing is a 2020 album by Kronos Quartet celebrating the music of Pete Seeger. The album was commissioned by the FreshGrass Foundation and released on the Smithsonian Folkways label. This release follows 2017's Folk Songs, which saw the Kronos Quartet teaming with a variety of folk musicians.

Track listing

 "Which Side Are You On?" – 2:22
 "The President Sang Amazing Grace" – 3:56
 "Raghupati Raghav Raja Ram" – 3:40
 "Waist Deep in the Big Muddy" – 3:23
 "Jarama Valley" – 3:18
 "Garbage" – 3:06
 "Storyteller" (Jacob Garchik) – 16:29
 "Mbube" – 2:44
 "If I Had a Hammer" – 2:07
 "Where Have All the Flowers Gone?" – 4:03
 "Step By Step" – 3:02
 "Andajaleo" – 2:37
 "Kisses Sweeter Than Wine" – 3:10
 "Turn, Turn, Turn" – 3:57
 "We Shall Overcome" – 5:09

Personnel 
 Kronos Quartet
 Hank Dutt – viola
 David Harrington – violin
 John Sherba – violin
 Sunny Yang – cello

 Friends
 Sam Amidon – vocals, banjo
 Maria Arnal – vocals
 Brian Carpenter – vocals
 Lee Knight – vocals, banjo
 Meklit Hadero – vocals
 Aoife O'Donovan – vocals

 Production
 Kronos Quartet and Reshena Liao – producers
 Arrangements by Jacob Garchik
 Scott Fraser – engineering for Kronos Quartet
 Mixed by David Harrington and Zach Miley
 Additional mixing by John Kilgore
 Bob Ludwig – mastering at Gateway Mastering Studios, Portland, Maine, United States

See also
List of 2020 albums

References 

Kronos Quartet albums
Smithsonian Folkways albums
2020 albums
Folk albums by American artists